A list of animated feature films first released in 1982.

See also
 List of animated television series of 1982

References

 Feature films
1982
1982-related lists